Rakeshwar Pandey  (14 January 1960) is National Senior Secretary of Indian National Trade Union Congress, INTUC and is related to Indian National Congress Party, politically.
Rakeshwar Pandey stays in Jamshedpur, where he is Union President of over a dozen companies which include various companies of Tata Group, Nuvoco Vistas corp. Ltd India, Indian cable Company, etc. Besides, Pandey is also President of Tisco Mazdoor Union.

Additionally, Rakeshwar Pandey is a Member of Governing Board, Open Forum, development organisation and an NGO based out of New Delhi, for promoting ICTs in the communities.

Early life
Rakeshwar Pandey was born in Sasaram District, Bihar on 14 January 1960 in a very lower-middle-class family. 
He is married to Sita Pandey. They both have three daughters named Jyoti, Dr. Prity and Reeti.

Early career

Rakeshwar Pandey started his career with Tata Steel Growth shop, wherein he joined as apprentice and after few years he became union's general secretary in the same company. Subsequently he became union president in Tata Steel growth shop in late 90s. He started becoming popular among labourers in Jamshedpur because of his caring and equality for all nature. In few years, Mr. Pandey also became Union President of TRF  and Tayo Rolls, a subsidiary of Tata Steel. Afterwards, he has risen in his career very strongly as Union President and in INTUC.

Positions held

National Senior Secretary, Indian National Trade Union Congress, INTUC 
General secretary,  Indian National Metal Workers Federation
Sr. Vice President, Indian National Electricity Workers Federation
Sr. Vice President, Indian National Cement Workers Federation
President , INTUC Jharkhand Branch.
Union President, Tata Power Employees Union 
Union President, Tata Robins Fraser Labour Union
Union President, TAYO Workers Union
Union President, Tisco Mazdoor Union
Union President, JEMCO Employee Union
Union President, Wire Product Labour Union
Union President, The Golmuri Tinpate Workers Union
Union President, INCAB Employees Association
Union President, Lafarge India Employees Union
Union President, Tata Bluescope Employees Union
Union President, Indian Oxygen Workers Union, Jamshedpur
Union President, Jadugoda Labour Union
Union President, Neelachal Iron & Power Employees Union
Union President, Tata Steel Processing And Distribution Employees Union
Union President, Canteen, Hotel & Restaurant Workers Union
Union President, Tata Steel Rural Development Workers Union
Union President, Tata Steel Tribal Cultures Society Workers Union
Union President, Nico Jubilee Park Employee Union
Union President, Jharkhand Steel Metal & Mines Employee Union
Union President, Jharkhand Transport Workers Union
Union President, Brajraj Ispat Employees Union
Union President, RSB Transmission Employees Union
Union President, Bina Metal Employees Union
Union President, Nutech Employees Union
Union President, Sonico Employees Union
Union President, Jamshedpur Hospital Employees Union
Union President, MTMH Employees Union
Union President, AIWC Employees Union
Member, Central Advisory Board of Minimum Wages, Ministry of Labour & Employment, Govt. of India
Member of Governing Board, Open Forum
Chairman, Tinplate Union Mahila Mahavidyalaya
Chairman, Bal Gyanpeeth High School
Chairman, Radha Krishna Memorial Trust
Chairman, Singhbhoom Mahila Vikas Manch

Pandey speaks to various social, management, leadership on labour related topics across India such as XLRI, CII & other important places. He is also Union Leader of many other companies in Jamshedpur and other places. He is very active social worker and is involved with NGOs, Hospitals etc.

Representing India

Rakeshwar Pandey has represented India in Geneva in 2008, in International Labour Conference. He has been part of Changement in Canada in 2001. In last few years, he has been to United States, China, Sri Lanka & European Countries to participate in discussions & enhancing world's industrial relations which helps labourers across the world.

References

Jharkhand politicians
1960 births
Living people
Indian National Congress politicians